David Alasdair Boudia (born April 24, 1989) is an American diver. He won the gold medal in the 10 metre platform diving competition at the 2012 Summer Olympics and the bronze medal in the same event at the 2016 Summer Olympics.  He also won a bronze medal with Nick McCrory in the men's synchronized 10 metre platform at the 2012 Summer Olympics and a silver medal in the same event with Steele Johnson at the 2016 Summer Olympics.

Early life
Born in Abilene, Texas, Boudia's parents are Jim and Sheilagh Boudia. He graduated from Noblesville High School in 2007, and attended Purdue University. He resides in West Lafayette, Indiana.

He started diving in 2000, and has been a member of the U.S. National Diving Team since 2005. Boudia once stated that a dive from the great height of an Olympic 10-meter platform once 'petrified' him.

Diving career

Boudia was named to the 2008 U.S. Olympic team in the 10-meter platform and in the synchronized 10-meter platform event with former synchro partner Thomas Finchum. Boudia and Finchum were 2009 World Championship (Rome) Silver Medalists, and 2007 World Championship (Melbourne) Bronze Medalists. With his past synchro partner, Nick McCrory, they achieved bronze medals at the 2012 Summer Olympics.

He is the winner of the Big 10 Male Tower Diving event at the Big Ten Tournament, held in 2010 at Ohio State. He is the inaugural American to break 600 points in six dives.

2012 Summer Olympics

In his first event at the 2012 Summer Olympics, Boudia and his partner, Nicholas McCrory, won the bronze in the synchronized 10 metre platform with a combined score of 463.47, finishing behind China (486.78) and Mexico (468.90). The United States did not medal in men's divers at the 1996 Atlanta Summer Olympics; at the next two Olympiads of 2004 and 2008, no men's divers made the podium in diving.

In his second event, the 10 metre platform, Boudia barely advanced from the prelims placing eighteenth but then went on to finish third in the semi-finals to advance to the finals. In the sixth and last round, Boudia won gold with a total score of 568.65, finishing ahead of world champion Qiu Bo (566.85) and hometown favorite Tom Daley (556.95). It was the first Olympic gold for the United States in diving since the 2000 Summer Olympics, when Laura Wilkinson won the gold in the women's 10-meter platform competition; the first Olympic gold in the 10-meter platform competition by an American male diver since Greg Louganis achieved that feat at the 1988 Summer Olympics (also taking the 3-meter springboard title); and the first Olympic diving gold for an American man since Mark Lenzi's victory in the 3-meter springboard competition at the 1992 Summer Olympics.

2016 Summer Olympics

Boudia partnered with Steele Johnson in the synchronized 10-meter platform dive at the 2016 Olympics in Rio.  They won a silver behind the Chinese pair Chen Aisen and Lin Yue.
In the individual 10 metre platform event, Boudia won a bronze.

After the Olympics, Boudia took a break in 2017 from international competition before making a decision on whether to retire or return for a fourth Olympics.  He chose to return in fall 2017 and go for a fourth Olympics in 2020. However, in February 2018, he suffered a concussion due to an error during training that caused him to crash into the water hard, after which he experienced blackouts and dizziness.

Boudia decided to switch event from 10m platform to 3m springboard following the concussion. At the 2019 World Championships held in Gwangju, Korea, Boudia participated in the 3m springboard event, but only managed to finish 5th.

Television
In November 2012, Boudia agreed to join Steve Foley as a judge on Splash. This reality show premiered on ABC on March 19, 2013.

Book
Boudia wrote an autobiography, Greater Than Gold, published by Thomas Nelson in 2016.

Personal life
Boudia became a Christian in 2010 through the influence of his college diving coach Adam Soldati. He openly referenced his religious beliefs in several interviews before, during, and after the 2012 Olympics.
On October 12, 2012, Boudia married Sonnie Brand, whom he met while studying at Purdue University.  In October 2014, Boudia and his wife welcomed their first child, Dakoda. On August 24, 2017, Boudia announced the birth of his second daughter, Mila Primm Boudia. On April 22, 2019, Knox Boudia was born, giving David his first son.

Major competition results 
Summer Olympics
3rd 10m Platform 2016 Rio de Janeiro, BRA 525.25
2nd Synchronised 10m Platform 2016 Rio de Janeiro, BRA 457.11
1st 10m Platform 2012 London, GBR 568.65
3rd Synchronized 10m Platform 2012 London
5th	Synchronised 10m Platform	2008	Beijing, CHN 440.64
10th	10m Platform	2008	Beijing, CHN 441.45

World Championships
2nd	10m Platform	2011	Shanghai, CHN	544.25
2nd	Synchronised 10m Platform	2009	Rome, ITA	456.94
3rd	Synchronised 10m Platform	2007	Melbourne, VIC, AUS	463.56
5th	Synchronised 10m Platform	2011	Shanghai, CHN	420.69
6th	10m Platform	2009	Rome, ITA	491.80

World Series
1st	Synchronised 10m Platform	2012	Tijuana, MEX	453.57
2nd	10m Platform	2012	Tijuana, MEX	543.25
2nd	Synchronised 10m Platform	2012	Moscow, RUS	448.32
2nd	Synchronised 10m Platform	2011	Guanajuato, MEX	437.10
2nd	10m Platform	2010	Veracruz, MEX	528.00
3rd	10m Platform	2012	Moscow, RUS	518.40
3rd	10m Platform	2012	Dubai, UAE	521.60
3rd	10m Platform	2011	Sheffield, GBR	534.55
3rd	Synchronised 10m Platform	2009	Mexico City, MEX	421.08

World Cup
1st	Team Event	2010	Changzhou, CHN	455.35
4th	10m Platform	2012	London, GBR	501.10
4th	Synchronised 10m Platform	2012	London, GBR	444.93
4th	Synchronised 10m Platform	2010	Changzhou, CHN	448.89

Grand Prix
1st	Synchronised 10m Platform	2010	Fort Lauderdale, FL, USA	461.19
1st	Synchronised 10m Platform	2009	Fort Lauderdale, FL, USA	457.26
3rd	Synchronised 10m Platform	2011	Fort Lauderdale, FL, USA	438.51

References

External links
 
 
 

1989 births
Living people
Divers at the 2007 Pan American Games
Divers at the 2008 Summer Olympics
Divers at the 2012 Summer Olympics
Divers at the 2016 Summer Olympics
Olympic gold medalists for the United States in diving
Olympic silver medalists for the United States in diving
Olympic bronze medalists for the United States in diving
Sportspeople from Abilene, Texas
People from Noblesville, Indiana
Purdue Boilermakers men's divers
American male divers
Sportspeople from Indiana
Participants in American reality television series
Medalists at the 2012 Summer Olympics
Medalists at the 2016 Summer Olympics
Pan American Games gold medalists for the United States
American non-fiction writers
Pan American Games medalists in diving
Big Ten Athlete of the Year winners
Medalists at the 2007 Pan American Games